Cordial is the tenth studio album from Québécois band La Bottine Souriante. It was released in 2001 through the band's own label, Les Productions Mille-Pattes.

Like in the band's recent albums, contemporary instruments are added in to give the songs a modern sound. In this album, synthesizers, drums and mixing (track 16) are introduced. The first track is even mixed with traditional arabic music. All the songs and reels are still mostly traditional.

Personnel
Régent Archambault: Double bass, electric bass, chorist voice
Michel Bordeleau: Guitar, mandolin, fiddle, percussion, feet, soloist and chorist voice
Pierre Bélisle: Piano, piano accordion, synthesizer, trumpet, hammond B-3
André Brunet: Fiddle, guitar, percussion, chorist voice
Robert Ellis: Bass trombone, percussion, chorist voice
Jean Fréchette: Tenor saxophone, percussion, whistle, chorist voice
Yves Lambert: Accordions, harmonicas, spoons, soloist and chorist voice
Jocelyn Lapointe: Trumpet, flugelhorn
André Verreault: Trombon

Track listing
 Dans Paris y'a t'une brune (The Brunette from Paris) – 3:10 
 La grondeuse (The Grumbling Woman) – 4:04
 Le démon sort de l'enfer (The Devil Comes out of Hell) – 4:32
 Set à Ubert (Ubert's Set) – 3:30
 En p'tit boggie (Giddy Up) – 2:44
 Aimé – 3:40
 Lune de miel (Honeymoon) – 3:44
 Suède Inn – 3:10
 J'ai fait une maîtresse (I Got Me a Mistress) – 2:36
 À bas les rideaux (Out with the Lies) – 3:51
 Les noces d'or (Golden Wedding Reel) – 2:15
 Viens-tu prendre une bière? (Come Have a Beer!) – 2:34
 Ma paillasse (My Straw Mat) – 3:02
 Chant de la luette (The Warbler's Song) – 2:54
 Reel de Baie St-Paul (Baie St-Paul's Reel) – 5:37
 Et boucle La Bottine (And "Loop" La Bottine) – 7:22

2001 albums
La Bottine Souriante albums